Frederick Chapman Robbins (August 25, 1916 – August 4, 2003) was an American pediatrician and virologist. He was born in Auburn, Alabama, and grew up in Columbia, Missouri, attending David H. Hickman High School.

He received the Nobel Prize in Physiology or Medicine in 1954 along with John Franklin Enders and Thomas Huckle Weller, making Robbins the only Nobel laureate born in Alabama. The award was for breakthrough work in isolating and growing the poliovirus in tissue culture, paving the way for vaccines developed by Jonas Salk and Albert Sabin.  He attended the University of Missouri and Harvard University.

In 1952, he was appointed professor of pediatrics at Case Western Reserve University. Robbins was elected a fellow of the American Academy of Arts and Sciences in 1962. From 1966 to 1980, Robbins was dean of the School of Medicine at Case Western. He was elected to the American Philosophical Society in 1972. In 1980, he assumed the presidency of the National Academy of Sciences' Institute of Medicine. He had been a member of the National Academy of Sciences since 1972. Five years later, in 1985, Robbins returned to Case Western Reserve as dean emeritus and distinguished university professor emeritus. He continued to be a fixture at the medical school until his death in 2003. The medical school's Frederick C. Robbins Society is named in his honor.  His wife, Alice N. Robbins, died in 2016. She was the daughter of Nobel laureate John Howard Northrop.

Robbins received the Benjamin Franklin Medal for Distinguished Achievement in the Sciences of the American Philosophical Society in 1999.

See also
 List of Case Western people

References

Further reading

  including the Nobel Lecture, December 11, 1954 The Cultivation of the Poliomyelitis Viruses in Tissue Culture 
 

1916 births
2003 deaths
Case Western Reserve University faculty
University of Missouri alumni
Hickman High School alumni
Harvard Medical School alumni
Members of the United States National Academy of Sciences
American Nobel laureates
Nobel laureates in Physiology or Medicine
Polio
American virologists
Fellows of the American Academy of Arts and Sciences
American pediatricians
People from Columbia, Missouri
Nobel laureates affiliated with Missouri
Scientists from Missouri
People from Auburn, Alabama
Members of the National Academy of Medicine
Members of the American Philosophical Society